Swingin' Till the Girls Come Home is an album by American jazz saxophonist Eddie "Lockjaw" Davis recorded in Copenhagen in 1976 and released on the Danish SteepleChase label. The album was also released in the U.S. on Inner City Records

Critical reception 

Allmusic called it "Fun, accessible and mostly hard-swinging straightahead music".

Track listing 
 "Swingin' Till the Girls Come Home" (Oscar Pettiford) – 4:32
 "Love for Sale" (Cole Porter) – 5:00
 "Out of Nowhere" (Johnny Green, Edward Heyman) – 5:59
 "I Don't Stand a Ghost of a Chance With You" (Victor Young, Bing Crosby, Ned Washington) – 4:44
 "Locks" (Eddie "Lockjaw" Davis) – 6:42
 "Wave" (Antônio Carlos Jobim) – 6:23
 "(Back Home Again in) Indiana" (Ballard MacDonald, James F. Hanley) – 3:08
 "Bye Bye Blackbird" (Ray Henderson, Mort Dixon) – 3:40
 "I Don't Stand a Ghost of a Chance With You" [alternate take] (Young, Crosby, Washington) – 4:46 Bonus track on CD reissue
 "Swingin' Till the Girls Come Home" [alternate take] (Pettiford) – 4:37 Bonus track on CD reissue
 "Bye Bye Blackbird" [alternate take] (Henderson, Dixon) – 3:30 Bonus track on CD reissue

Personnel 
 Eddie "Lockjaw" Davis – tenor saxophone
 Thomas Clausen – piano
 Bo Stief – bass
 Alex Riel – drums

References 

Eddie "Lockjaw" Davis albums
1976 albums
SteepleChase Records albums
Inner City Records albums